Corydoras kanei is a small species of catfish from the family Callyichthydae endemic to Brazil where it is found in the Negros River basin. It is externally similar to Corydoras atropersonatus, but its spots are denser and unlike the former, it has caudal markings - markings on its tail fins. Breeding can be accomplished by feeding a mixture of live foods and catfish pellets, after which frequent cold water changes can trigger them to spawn. A gravid female will lay around 60 eggs; heavy oxygenation of the water is likely to be more efficacious at saving fry than using methylene blue. Fry grow slowly and reach around 2 cm after 8 months. It is not recommended to add different fish into the fry rearing tank. They do not mind lower temperatures and can be kept with species of fish that are endemic to low-temperature habitats, such as Sewellia lineolata.

To appreciate this fish, they should be kept in a large group in a well-oxygenated, fairly bright tank which nonetheless has some hiding areas. They will give off a beautiful silvery/blue shine as they swim through the tank.

References 
 

Corydoras
Fish of South America
Fish of Brazil
Endemic fauna of Brazil
Fish described in 1998